The Roulet Family is a Franco-German noble family of Alsace. It was established by Rollet Bayard (died 1512), in the late 15th century. François Roulet of Neuchâtel (1768–1845) was ennobled by Friedrich-Wilhelm III, and took the name de Roulet.

Notable members
 Lorinda de Roulet American heiress, philanthropist and former president of the New York Mets
 Donald Roulet Presbyterian minister and civil rights activist
 Vincent de Roulet United States Ambassador to Jamaica

References

External links
 Roulet

German noble families